Éamon Cleary is a retired Irish sportsperson.

Career
He played hurling with the Wexford senior inter-county team in the 1980s and won an All Star award in 1989, being picked in the full back position.

Racing interests
He owned and bred the horse that won the Cheltenham Champion Hurdle called Annie Power. 
 
He owns the 2018 Irish Greyhound Derby winner Ballyanne Sim.

References

External links
GAA Info Profile

Living people
Wexford inter-county hurlers
Year of birth missing (living people)
People in greyhound racing